An Opportunity Zone is a designation and investment program created by the Tax Cuts and Jobs Act of 2017 allowing for certain investments in lower income areas to have tax advantages.  The purpose of this program is to put capital to work that would otherwise be locked up due to the asset holder's unwillingness to trigger a capital gains tax.

History
Opportunity zones were proposed by Senators Tim Scott, Cory Booker, and Representatives Ron Kind, Pat Tiberi and supported by Sean Parker's Economic Innovation Group. States may designate up to 25% of low-income census tracts as Opportunity Zones. Opportunity Zones were created under the 2017 Tax Cuts and Jobs Act, signed into law by President Donald Trump.

The first Opportunity Zones were designated in April 2018. There are more than 8,768 zones in the 50 states, and five U.S. possessions, including American Samoa, Guam, Northern Mariana Islands, Puerto Rico, and the Virgin Islands.

Not all Opportunity Zones are in low income communities.  In May 2018, Treasury Secretary Steven Mnuchin instructed his staff to accept a non-low-income tract (a business area in Storey County, Nevada) as an Opportunity Zone shortly after attending a Milken Institute event in Beverly Hills with Michael Milken.  Milken was already an investor in the Nevada tract.  Treasury later issued a regulatory guidance that allows prior investors to benefit from newly designated Opportunity Zones.

Requirements
To qualify, the Opportunity Fund must invest more than 90% of its assets in a Qualified Opportunity Zone Property located in an Opportunity Zone. The property must be significantly improved, which means it must be an original use, or the basis of the property must be double the basis of the non-land assets. Capital gain taxes are deferred for investments reinvested into investments in these zones and, if the investment is held for ten years, all capital gains on the new investment are waived. Despite the advantage, the Opportunity Fund has also many cons.  Opportunity zones are census tracts designated by state authorities. As of Pari, 8,764 census tracts have been so designated.

An investor must invest in an Opportunity Fund by the end of 2019 to meet the seven-year holding period and be able to exclude 15% of the deferred capital gain. An investor may exclude 10% of the deferred capital gain by investing in an Opportunity Fund by the end of 2021 to meet the five-year holding period.

An investor who realizes certain capital gain income may reinvest the capital gain in an Opportunity Fund within 180 days.

Tax benefits
Prior to the law creating Opportunity Zones, an investor could defer capital gains taxes by trading one asset with another asset in the same asset class by using a Section 1031 exchange. Opportunity Zones now allow an investor to defer capital gains taxes by trading one asset with another asset in a different asset class.

See also
 Keystone Opportunity Zone
 Empowerment zone
 Urban renewal
 Gentrification
 Special economic zone

References

External links
 
 
 
 
 
 
 

Special economic zones of the United States
United States tax law
Presidency of Donald Trump